Maria Teresa Pinto Basto Patrício de Gouveia, GOIH GCIH GCC GCOH KMM (born on 18 July 1946), commonly known as Teresa Patrício de Gouveia, is a Portuguese cultural manager, public servant and retired politician.

Background
Gouveia is a daughter of Afonso Patrício de Gouveia (Guarda, Sé, 18 July 1915 – present) and wife Maria Madalena d'Orey Ferreira Pinto Basto (Lisbon, 19 August 1925 – present), from a Family of the high Bourgeoisie and some Nobility and of more or less distant English, German, French and Italian descent. One of her brothers, António, died in Camarate air crash along with the then Prime Minister, Francisco Sá Carneiro, and the  Minister of Defense, Adelino Amaro da Costa.

Career
Gouveia is a licentiate in history from the Faculty of Letters of the University of Lisbon.

Gouveia became a member of the European Council, Secretary of State for Culture and Minister for the Environment and Natural Resources in the XIth Constitutional Government, Deputy to the Assembly of the Republic, Minister of Foreign Affairs (2003–2004) and President of the Serralves Foundation.

Other activities
 European Council on Foreign Relations (ECFR), Member of the Board of Trustees (since 2020)

Political positions
In February 2020, Gouveia joined around fifty former European prime ministers and foreign ministers in signing an open letter published by British newspaper The Guardian to condemn U.S. President Donald Trump’s Middle East peace plan, saying it would create an apartheid-like situation in occupied Palestinian territory.

Decorations
Gouveia was decorated with the Grand Cross of the Order of Prince Henry.

Marriage and child
Gouveia married in Lisbon on 4 August 1971 and divorced on 20 February 1981 Writer and Poet Alexandre O'Neill. The couple had a son:

 Afonso de Gouveia O'Neill (28 May 1976 –)

References

External links
 Teresa Patrício de Gouveia's Genealogy in a Portuguese Genealogical site

1946 births
Living people
Foreign ministers of Portugal
Female foreign ministers
Patricio Gouveia, Teresa
People from Lisbon

Portuguese people of British descent
University of Lisbon alumni
Women government ministers of Portugal
Patricio Gouveia, Teresa